Petar Krpan (born 1 July 1974) is a Croatian retired footballer who played as a forward.

Club career
Born in Osijek, Socialist Federal Republic of Yugoslavia, Krpan started his career with local club NK Osijek. Due to the war breaking out in 1991, as a 17-year-old he engaged in battle to help save his hometown. He moved to Sporting Clube de Portugal in 1998, being scarcely used during his one-and-a-half-season spell.

In January 2000, staying in Portugal, Krpan left for U.D. Leiria and played for the team until the summer of 2001, initially on loan. He then returned to Croatia and played one season apiece for Osijek, NK Zagreb and HNK Hajduk Split, before returning to Leiria for 2004–05; he was an important attacking element during the campaign as the latter team barely avoided relegation from the Primeira Liga, notably scoring in a 1–1 away draw against FC Porto.

In 2005, Krpan once again moved back to his country by joining HNK Rijeka, where he spent one season before moving to second division side NK Inter Zaprešić.

International career
Krpan won three caps for the Croatia national team in 1998, all as a second-half substitute. His debut occurred on 6 June in a friendly match with Australia, in Zagreb. His final international was a September 1998 European Championship qualification match away against the Republic of Ireland.

Krpan was a member of the bronze medal-winning squad at the 1998 FIFA World Cup where he made one appearance, playing the last 13 minutes of the round-of-16 match against Romania (1–0).

Honours

Club
NK Zagreb
Croatian First League: 2001–02

Hajduk Split
Croatian First League: 2003–04
Croatian Football Cup: 2002–03

Rijeka
Croatian Football Cup: 2005–06

Inter Zaprešić
Croatian Second League: 2006–07

Individual
Franjo Bučar State Award for Sport: 1998

Orders
 Order of the Croatian Interlace – 1998

References

External links

1974 births
Living people
Footballers from Osijek
Association football forwards
Croatian footballers
Croatia international footballers
1998 FIFA World Cup players
NK Osijek players
Sporting CP footballers
U.D. Leiria players
NK Zagreb players
HNK Hajduk Split players
HNK Rijeka players
Jiangsu F.C. players
NK Inter Zaprešić players
Croatian Football League players
Primeira Liga players
China League One players
Croatian expatriate footballers
Expatriate footballers in Portugal
Croatian expatriate sportspeople in Portugal
Expatriate footballers in China
Croatian expatriate sportspeople in China